Song Peizhang (1919–1989) was a People's Republic of China politician and People's Liberation Army senior colonel. He was born in Lincheng County, Hebei Province. He was Communist Party of China Committee Secretary and Governor of Anhui Province. He was a member of the 10th Central Committee of the Communist Party of China and a delegate to the 4th National People's Congress.

1919 births
1989 deaths
People's Republic of China politicians from Hebei
Chinese Communist Party politicians from Hebei
Governors of Anhui
Political office-holders in Anhui
People's Liberation Army officers
Members of the 10th Central Committee of the Chinese Communist Party
Delegates to the 4th National People's Congress